Amina Mezioud (born 1988) is an Algerian chess player, and a woman grandmaster.

She won the Women's Arab Chess Championship in 2006, and has competed in the Women's World Chess Championship three times, in 2006, 2010 and 2012.

She competed in the Women's World Chess Championship 2015 (knock-out), seeded #62 (of 64).

References

External links
her entry at chess games
her photo

Living people
Algerian female chess players
1988 births
Place of birth missing (living people)
African Games silver medalists for Algeria
African Games medalists in chess
Competitors at the 2011 All-Africa Games
21st-century Algerian women
20th-century Algerian women